The 2002 Union for a Popular Movement leadership election was held on November 17, 2002 to elect the leadership of the newly created Union for a Popular Movement (Union pour un mouvement populaire, UMP).

Alain Juppé, a former Prime Minister and close ally of President Jacques Chirac, became the new party's first president.

Presidential candidates
Candidates seeking to run for the party presidency needed to win the endorsements of at least 3% of party members. Each candidate created a "ticket" with two other party members for the offices of vice-president and secretary-general of the UMP.

Alain Juppé: mayor of Bordeaux, deputy for the Gironde's 2nd constituency and former Prime Minister between 1995 and 1997 (ex-RPR)
Candidate for vice president: Jean-Claude Gaudin, mayor of Marseille and Senator for the Bouches-du-Rhône (ex-DL)
Candidate for secretary-general: Philippe Douste-Blazy, mayor of Toulouse and deputy of the Haute-Garonne's 1st constituency (ex-UDF)
Nicolas Dupont-Aignan: mayor of Yerres and deputy for the Essonne's 8th constituency (ex-RPR)
Candidate for vice president: Sylvie Perrin (ex-RPR)
Candidate for secretary-general: Christophe Beaudouin (ex-RPR)
Rachid Kaci: former member of Alain Madelin's campaign staff in the 2002 presidential election (ex-DL)
Candidate for vice president: Alexandre del Valle (ex-RPR)
Candidate for secretary-general: Monique Boury
Brigitte Freytag: ex-RPR
Candidate for vice president: Alexandre Chermezon (ex-RPR)
Candidate for secretary-general: Cyril Lendrin (ex-RPR)
Mourad Ghazli: ex-RPR
Candidate for vice president: Catherine Rigny
Candidate for secretary-general: Philippe Licha

Results

References

Election, 2002
Union for a Popular Movement leadership election
Union for a Popular Movement leadership election
Political party leadership elections in France
Union for a Popular Movement leadership election
Union for a Popular Movement leadership election